Ozy may refer to:

 Ozy (media company), an American media company
 Ozymandias Llewellyn, a fictional character in the comic strip Ozy and Millie

See also
 Ozymandias (disambiguation)
 Ozzy (disambiguation)